Lindström Group is a textile rental service company in Europe and Asia. Lindström operates in 24 countries and has over 4,000 employees. The company is headquartered in Helsinki, Finland. Lindström was established in 1848.

History
Lindström was founded by Carl August Lindström in 1848, in Helsinki. The company was originally in the textile dye house and it was called C.A Lindström & Son. In 1891, Carl August Lindström handed the company over to his son, W.E. Lindström. In 1918, Lindström Oy was turned into a joint stock company and the name was changed to AB W.E. Lindström Oy.

In the 1920s, the Lindström family sold their shares to the Roiha family who maintain ownership and control over the company today. In the 1930s, the company focused on the textile dye and laundry business. In the 1940s, the company experienced major setbacks during and after the Winter War and the Continuation War. Industrial laundry services experienced a drop in demand when the availability of textile products suffered. In the 1950s, the demand for industrial laundry services dropped, which made Lindström offer laundry services to consumers. The company also began investing in and focusing on the textile rental services business.

In the 1960s, Lindström started actively marketing its textile rental services to companies as it was seen as a source for potential future earnings. In 1974, Lindström bought its biggest competitor in the textile industry, market leader Lainatekstiili Oy from Tampella Oy.

In the beginning of the 1970s, the demand for consumer laundry services plummeted as the popularity of home washing machines increased. In the mid-1970s, Lindström started offering more cleaning services. Due to this shift in focus, the company bought Laite-Siivous Oy in 1975. Lindström began matt and mop rentals in 1971. In 1976 the company closed its textile dye unit because the business had become unprofitable.

Through acquisitions, Lindström Oy was evolving into a holding company. After the mid-1970s, Lindström Group decided to focus on the development of the Lindström brand, which is why it started marketing many of the businesses it owned jointly under the Lindström name.

In the 1980s, the company was involved in several mergers and acquisitions. In most cases, Lindström was the buyer, although it also sold some companies it had bought earlier, but which had since turned out unprofitable.

In the 1990s, Lindström gave up cleaning and waste management services, as well as its laundry shops, and directed its full attention to textile renting services. In the same decade, the company began pursuing an aggressive international expansion strategy. Lindström internationalization began from Estonia in 1992. After that it launched operations in several European countries.

In 2006 Lindström launched its Asian operations in Suzhou, China and in 2007 the company established a subsidiary in India. Today Lindström operates in 24 countries in Europe and Asia.

In 2017, the company's revenue was 358 million euros. It had over 100,000 customers globally.

Services
Lindström offers workwear, mat, hotel textile, washroom, industrial wiper, restaurant textile, personal protective equipment services.

International operations
Lindström operates in 22 countries including European countries like Ukraine, Finland and Poland and Asian countries like South Korea, China and India.

References

External links
 LindstromGroup.com

Companies based in Helsinki